Jusuf Serang Kasim (2 February 1944 – 12 November 2021) was an Indonesian politician. A member of Golkar and later Nasdem, he served as Mayor of Tarakan from 1999 to 2009.

References

1944 births
2021 deaths
Golkar politicians
Nasdem Party politicians
People from Tarakan